FEHRL, the Forum of European National Highway Research Laboratories was created in 1989 as an international organisation. In 2000, it became an association international sans but lucratif (AiSBL) or International association without lucrative purpose.

It currently includes 30 members from European countries as well as international affiliates from the United States, South Africa, Australia and Israel.

In French,  the organisation is/was known as Forum des Laboratoires nationaux Europeens de Recherche Routiere (FLERR).

Purpose 
Through research collaboration, the statutory objectives of FEHRL are:

 To provide scientific input to Europe and national government policy on highway engineering and road transport matters. 
 To create and maintain an efficient and safe road network in Europe. 
 To increase innovation in European road construction and road-using industries. 
 To improve the energy efficiency of highway engineering and operations 
 To protect the environment and improve quality of life.

Events
FEHRL holds an infrastructure research meeting every two years.

Membership 
Members are national institutes nominated by their respective national road administration or ministry.  Full members are from European countries according to the United Nations geoscheme for Europe classification or candidates for European Union membership. Associates come from non-European countries with S&T agreements with the EU. FEHRL National Groups are created in several countries to widen the cooperation with academia and other organisations

Current membership is;
 ANAS, Italy 
 AIT, Austria 
 BASt, Germany 
 BRRC, Belgium 
 CDV, Czech Republic 
 CEDEX, Spain 
 CESTRIN, Romania 
 CIRTNENS, Bulgaria 
 DRD, Denmark 
 IBDiM, Poland 
 ICERA, Iceland 
 IFSTTAR, France 
 FCEZG, Croatia 
 IP, Serbia  
 KEDE, Greece 
 KTI, Hungary 
 LVCELI, Latvia 
 EPFL, Switzerland 
 LNEC, Portugal 
 RRI, Lithuania 
 PCH, Luxemburg 
 NPRA, Norway 
 NRA, Ireland 
 RWS, Netherlands 
 TECER, Estonia 
 TRL, UK 
 VTI, Sweden 
 VUD, Slovakia 
 ZAG, Slovenia      
 DerzhdorNDI, Ukraine 
  
 
Associates are;
 ARRB, Australia 
 CSIR, South Africa    
 INRC, Israel 
 Federal Highway Administration, USA

References

External links

Road transport organizations
1989 establishments in Belgium
International organisations based in Belgium
Pan-European trade and professional organizations